The 20th Trampoline World Championships were held in Sydney, Australia from 9 October to 11 October 1998.

Results

Men

Trampoline Individual

Trampoline Team

Trampoline Synchro

Double Mini Trampoline

Double Mini Trampoline Team

Tumbling

Tumbling Team

Women

Trampoline Individual

Trampoline Team

Trampoline Synchro

Double Mini Trampoline

Double Mini Trampoline Team

Tumbling

Tumbling Team

References
 Trampoline UK

Trampoline Gymnastics World Championships
Trampoline World Championships
Trampoline World Championships
Sports competitions in Sydney
International gymnastics competitions hosted by Australia